Canadian constitutional law is the area of Canadian law relating to the interpretation and application of the Constitution of Canada by the courts. All laws of Canada, both provincial and federal, must conform to the Constitution and any laws inconsistent with the Constitution have no force or effect.

In Reference re Secession of Quebec, the Supreme Court characterized four fundamental and organizing principles of the Constitution (though not exhaustive): federalism; democracy; constitutionalism and the rule of law; and protection of minorities.

Reviewable matters and legal standing
Under the authority of section 52(1) of the Constitution Act, 1982, courts may review all matters of law. Accordingly, the courts have a broad scope of competence. Constitutional issues come before the court through disputes between parties as well as through reference questions. The court has the discretion to hear any Constitutional issues as long as there is a sufficient legal component. The U.S. constitutional political questions doctrine was rejected and so a political dimension to the issue does not bar it from court.

Courts must be careful when considering reference questions. They are required to be careful to only answer questions that are not speculative, of a purely political nature, or unripe. When answering the questions the court must retain its proper role within the constitutional framework.

A party must have standing (locus standi) to bring a constitutional challenge to the courts. Those who wish to challenge a law can do so in one of several ways. A party who is directly affected by the law that purports to be unconstitutional has standing as of right. Likewise, rights holder may challenge any law that will limit any of their rights. Those who are not protected by a right but are nonetheless prosecuted by that law may challenge it as well.

Public interest groups may also gain standing if they satisfy the requirements of the Borowski test. The group must demonstrate that the law raises a serious constitutional issue, the group has a genuine interest in the matter, and that there is no other reasonable and effective manner in which the issue may be brought before the Court.

Unwritten aspects of constitutional law

In rare cases, the courts have developed substantive rules of constitutional law that are not expressly set out in constitutional texts but rather implied by a number of different principles.

In Hunt v T&N plc, the Supreme Court of Canada found that "the integrating character of our constitutional arrangements as they apply to interprovincial mobility" called for the courts of each province to give "full faith and credit" to the judgments of courts of other provinceseven though Canada's constitution does not have an express Full Faith and Credit Clause. This development was criticized by at least one academic.

In the Provincial Judges Reference, the Supreme Court found that there was an unwritten constitutional principle that protected a right to judicial salary commissions for provincial court judges.

Concepts in interpretation

A "living tree"

Since the 1929 ruling in Edwards v Canada (AG), the courts have interpreted the Constitution within the context of society to ensure that it adapts and reflects changes. As Viscount Sankey stated, "The British North America Act planted in Canada a living tree capable of growth and expansion within its natural limits."

Purposive

The Canadian courts have adopted a liberal approach to the approach of statutory and constitutional interpretation, best expressed in the statement, "Today there is only one principle or approach, namely, the words of an Act are to be read in their entire context and in their grammatical and ordinary sense harmoniously with the scheme of the Act, the object of the Act, and the intention of Parliament."

Dialogue

In Charter jurisprudence, the "dialogue principle" is where judicial review of legislation is said to be part of a "dialogue" between the legislatures and the courts. It specifically involves governments drafting legislation in response to court rulings and courts acknowledging the effort if the new legislation is challenged.

Charter compliance

In 1982 the Canadian Charter of Rights and Freedoms was brought into effect. This was not meant to affect the workings of federalism, though some content was moved from section 91 to section 4 of the Charter.  Mainly, the Charter is meant to decrease powers of both levels of government by ensuring both federal and provincial laws respect Charter rights, under section 32.

The relationship between federalism and the Charter is directly dealt with in section 31, which declares that neither the federal nor provincial governments gain powers under the Charter.

In R v Big M Drug Mart Ltd, it was found that legislation whose purpose is found to violate the Charter cannot be saved even if its effects were found to be inoffensive. If a provision of law cannot be seen to constitute a reasonable limit, demonstrably justifiable in a free and democratic society, it cannot be saved pursuant to section 1 of the Charter. The determination of s. 1 validity follows the Oakes test first expressed in R v Oakes, which follows four parts, of which the last three have been named as the "proportionality test":

the reason for the rights violation must be "pressing and substantial"
there must be a "rational connection" between the rights-infringing measure and the objective
the measure must be the least restrictive means for realizing the objective
the deleterious effects of the measure must be proportionate to the importance of the objective

Although modified in subsequent jurisprudence to relax its strictness, Oakes continues to be of valid application.

However, the provincial education power under Section 93 of the Constitution Act, 1867 is plenary, and is not subject to Charter attack, so long as it does not extend beyond the confines of Section 93's mandate to fund Roman Catholic separate schools and public schools.

Legislative competence

In order to rationalize how far each jurisdiction may use its authority, certain doctrines have been devised by the courts:

There are also differences in legislative competence in each of the Provinces, as each had entered Confederation on somewhat different terms. As Viscount Simon of the Privy Council noted in 1953:

Pith and substance
The pith and substance doctrine is founded on the recognition that it is in practice impossible for a legislature to exercise its jurisdiction over a matter effectively without incidentally affecting matters within the jurisdiction of another level of government.

Also, some matters are by their very nature impossible to categorize under a single head of power: they may have both provincial and federal aspects.  The double aspect doctrine, which applies in the course of a pith and substance analysis, ensures that the policies of the elected legislators of both levels of government are respected, by recognizing that both Parliament and the provincial legislatures can adopt valid legislation on a single subject depending on the perspective from which the legislation is considered (i.e., depending on the various aspects of the matter in question).

In certain circumstances, however, the powers of one level of government must be protected against intrusions, even incidental ones, by the other level.  For this purpose, the courts have developed the doctrines of interjurisdictional immunity and federal paramountcy.

The Parliament of Canada has power to bind Her Majesty both in right of Canada and of any province, but provincial statutes do not of their own force bind the federal Crown. There is considerable debate as to whether interprovincial sovereign immunity exists.

In Re Upper Churchill Water Rights Reversion Act, an Act of the Newfoundland legislature was held to be unconstitutional because of colourability. While its stated purpose was to cancel a long-term lease and to expropriate power generation assets located in the province, its real purpose was to interfere with civil rights existing outside the province. As noted by Mr Justice McIntyre:

Certain measures that would be constitutionally valid if enacted on their own are invalid if they are combined with other measures that invade unconstitutionally into the other jurisdiction. This is held to be overreach. As noted by Viscount Haldane:

 In Reference re Assisted Human Reproduction Act, the federal use of the criminal law power was found in certain key aspects to overreach too far into the provincial hospitals power, as well as into the more familiar sphere of property and civil rights.
 In Reference re Securities Act, a proposed federal law for establishing a national securities regulator was held to overreach, as a whole, too far into the property and civil rights power, and was thus wholly unconstitutional.

"Double aspect" under Multiple Access

Multiple Access Ltd v McCutcheon held that, even when federal and provincial laws have been enacted on the same matter by virtue of the double aspect doctrine, the doctrine of paramountcy does not necessarily have to be invoked. In that regard, Mr Justice Dickson observed:

Therefore, paramountcy should only be invoked where there is a conflict between the federal and provincial laws in question. There is no danger of double recovery being possible where the laws are not in conflict, as no court would permit it.

Canadian Western Bank principles

The current approach to determining the constitutionality of legislation is founded in Canadian Western Bank v Alberta, where the Supreme Court of Canada summarized the following principles:

 the pith and substance of the provincial law and the federal law should be examined to ensure that they are both validly enacted laws and to determine the nature of the overlap, if any, between them.
 the applicability of the provincial law to the federal undertaking or matter in question must be resolved with reference to the doctrine of interjurisdictional immunity.
 only if both the provincial law and the federal law have been found to be valid pieces of legislation, and only if the provincial law is found to be applicable to the federal matter in question, then both statutes must be compared to determine whether the overlap between them constitutes a conflict sufficient to trigger the application of the doctrine of federal paramountcy.

The burden of proof falls on the party that is alleging paramountcy. As Mr Justice Binnie and Mr Justice LeBel noted:

Where the constitutionality of legislation is being questioned in relation to the division of powers under the Constitution Act, 1867,  an analysis of its pith and substance must be undertaken.  This analysis consists of an inquiry into the true nature of the law in question for the purpose of identifying the matter to which it essentially relates.

 If its pith and substance can be related to a matter that falls within the jurisdiction of the legislature that enacted it, the courts will declare it intra vires.
 If, however, it can more properly be said to relate to a matter that is outside the jurisdiction of that legislature, it will be held to be invalid owing to this violation of the division of powers.
 The corollary to this analysis is that legislation whose pith and substance falls within the jurisdiction of the legislature that enacted it may, at least to a certain extent, affect matters beyond the legislature’s jurisdiction without necessarily being unconstitutional.  At this stage of the analysis, the dominant purpose of the legislation is still decisive.
 Merely incidental effects will not disturb the constitutionality of an otherwise intra vires law.

Ancillary powers under Lacombe

In Quebec (AG) v Lacombe, the nature of any ancillary powers arising from the pith and substance of a matter was considered. As noted by Chief Justice McLachlin, the Chief Justice:

 The degree of integration required increases in proportion to the seriousness of the encroachment.
 Where the impugned measure encroaches only slightly on the jurisdiction of the other level of government, a rational, functional connection is required.
 As the degree of intrusion grows more serious, the required degree of integration tends toward a test of necessity.
 To meet the test, a prima facie invalid measure must complement rather than merely supplement the legislative scheme.  It must, both rationally and in its function, further the purposes of the valid legislative scheme of which it is said to be part.

Interjurisdictional immunity under COPA and PHS Community Services

In Quebec (AG) v Canadian Owners and Pilots Assn ("COPA"), Chief Justice McLachlin outlined a two-step test that must be undertaken to determine if interjurisdictional immunity comes into play:

Does the provincial law trench on the protected "core" of a federal competence?
Is the provincial law's effect on the exercise of the protected federal power sufficiently serious to invoke the doctrine of interjurisdictional immunity?

Though there remains some debate, it has generally been accepted that interjurisdictional immunity applies equally to both the federal and provincial governments. Nevertheless, virtually all of the case law concerns situations where provincial laws encroach on federal matters. In Canada (AG) v PHS Community Services Society, the Supreme Court expressed caution in employing the doctrine in future cases because:

It is in tension with the dominant approach that permits concurrent federal and provincial legislation with respect to a matter.
It is in tension with the emergent practice of cooperative federalism.
It may overshoot the federal or provincial power in which it is grounded and create legislative "no go" zones where neither level of government regulates.

As Chief Justice McLachlin explained in that decision:

Footnotes and citations

References

Case citations

Constitution of Canada